The following highways are numbered 463:

Canada
Manitoba Provincial Road 463
Newfoundland and Labrador Route 463

Japan 
  Japan National Route 463

United States 
  Arkansas Highway 463
  Louisiana Highway 463
  Mississippi Highway 463
  Pennsylvania Route 463
  Puerto Rico Highway 463
  South Carolina Highway 463 (former)
 Texas:
  Texas State Highway Loop 463
  Farm to Market Road 463